The 1982 Atlanta Braves season was the 17th in Atlanta and the 112th overall. They went 89–73 and won the NL West division for the first time since 1969, but were swept in 3 games by the St. Louis Cardinals in the NLCS.

Offseason 
 October 5, 1981: Gaylord Perry was released by the Braves.
 March 23, 1982: Brian Asselstine was released by the Braves.

Managerial turnover

In , Bobby Cox and Joe Torre were elected to the Baseball Hall of Fame as two of the most successful managers of the late-20th and early-21st centuries.  Cox had won 2,564 regular-season games, five pennants and one World Series over 29 seasons; Torre had won 2,326 games, six pennants and four World Series over his 29-year career. But when the 1981 season ended, those success stories seemed far-fetched, at best.  And both men ended up unemployed, if only briefly.

The New York Mets fired Torre on October 5, 1981; the Braves dismissed Cox three days later. Cox, finishing his fourth season during his first tour as Atlanta's manager, was only 266–323 (.452) with one over-.500 season; Torre was 286–420 (.405) in 4 seasons with the Mets.

Cox, then 40 years old, landed on his feet as manager of the American League Toronto Blue Jays—then a struggling expansion team in its fifth year of existence—on October 15, 1981; nine days later, Torre, 41, was announced as Cox's successor in Atlanta, returning to the team where he had become an All-Star catcher during the 1960s.  In different ways, the firings and hirings marked positive turning points in each man's career.

Torre's  Braves won their first 13 regular-season games en route to the National League West Division title, their first since 1969.  In three full seasons with the Braves, he went 257–229 (.529) and became nationally known as a manager through the Braves' powerful WTBS Superstation. Although a later, 5-year term (1990–1995) with the St. Louis Cardinals was not as successful, Torre would earn his Hall of Fame credentials with a 12-year run (1996–2007) as manager of the New York Yankees, winning six AL championships and four World Series, and compiling a winning percentage of .605.

Cox followed a different route to success. His talented but young 1982 Blue Jays, though still below .500, won more games (78) than ever before in their history. The Jays held a three games to one edge in the 1985 American League Championship Series, only to drop three straight games and the AL pennant to the eventual world champion Kansas City Royals.

Ted Turner's Braves, however, were heading in the opposite direction after 1982. He fired Torre after an 80–82 1984 season, then fired two more managers, Eddie Haas and Bobby Wine, after they lost a combined 96 games in 1985.

Cox would begin to rebuild the Braves from the front office, but the on-field losses continued to mount until Cox finally decided, on June 21, 1990, to return to uniform and the dugout as the team's manager.  By 1991, the Braves would be National League champions.

The regular season

The first half of the season 
The Braves started very hot in 1982, winning their first 13 games (April 6 through April 21) of the season, a new major league record (since equaled by the Milwaukee Brewers in 1987). The wins came at the expense of San Diego Padres (two), Houston Astros (six) and Cincinnati Reds (five). The streak began with a 1 – 0 victory in San Diego in the season opener and came to an end when the Reds edged the Braves 2 – 1 in Atlanta in the Braves' 14th game.

The Braves lost five straight after their record start and by the end of May they were 27 – 20 and struggling. Some critics claimed the Braves were just living off the feat of their 13-game winning streak and that they were not as good as their record showed. Some of the critics even predicted that the Braves would drift slowly out of contention and would be out of the running by mid-summer. However, the Braves warmed up again, and they won 12 of their first 15 games in the month of June to jump to 16 games above the .500 mark at 39 wins and 23 losses. This gave evidence that the Braves's 13 – 0 start was not just a fluke of luck, and this silenced their critics – at least for a while.

Next, the Braves slowed down again, and they slipped to a 43 – 29 record on June 29, but then they reeled off another six-game winning streak to build up a 4½ game lead in the National League Western Division on July 5. The Braves split their next four games, and they had a record of 51 – 31 (20 games above .500) on July 9 following a 6 – 4 victory over the Pittsburgh Pirates. That meant the Braves were setting pace to win 100 games for the season, which is a traditional mark for a very good team in either league. This was great improvement for a team that had struggled, mostly in the cellar, in 1975 through 1981. On the two days right before the All-Star Game, the Braves lost to the Pirates 6 – 1 and 3 – 1, but they were still on the top of the Western Division by two-games in the standings.

Second half 

The Braves started the second half of the 1982 season following the All-Star break with five wins versus only one loss in their first six games. This improved the Braves' won-loss record to 56–34 (22 games over .500) on July 20. Their lead over the second-place team in the division was then six games. That was the largest lead that a Braves team had ever achieved since the Braves had come to Atlanta for the 1966 season, even surpassing their largest divisional lead of their Western Division championship team of 1969.

However, from July 21 to 25, the Braves endured a small dip. They lost three out of four games, and their offense was atrocious, with their being shut out in all three of the losses: once by the St. Louis Cardinals and twice by the Pittsburgh Pirates. The Braves scored a rather-average four runs in the game that they won. Nevertheless, the Braves were 20 games over .500 with a record of 57 wins and 37 losses. They were also settling in for an 11-game series in their home ballpark, followed by an 11-game road trip, all of which were against foes in the Western Division.

The second-place San Diego Padres played against the Braves in Atlanta Stadium for the first four games. The Padres were followed by the third-place Los Angeles Dodgers for the next four games; and finally the fourth-place San Francisco Giants played three games against the Braves. Next, the Braves were back on the road again for four games with the Dodgers, three more with the Giants, and finally four more games versus the Padres.

The Braves had a five-game lead in the standings when the home series versus the Padres began. The Braves began the series by sweeping a doubleheader against the Padres by 9–2 and 8–6 scores. The Braves repeated this game on the next night with another 8–6 victory. Their lead in the Western Division had increased to a high-water mark of eight games, and the Padres were on their way down and out of second place and out of contention. The Braves' primary stalker for the rest of the season became the Los Angeles Dodgers.

With their 6–2 victory over the Padres on July 29, the Braves completed the four-game sweep, and the Braves' record soared to 61 wins and 37 losses – the first time since 1969 when the Braves once reached a high-water mark of 25 games over .500. The Braves held a nine-game lead over the Padres (at 53–47), and a 10½ game lead over the third-place Dodgers (52–49). The Giants (48–52) had nearly fallen out of contention, 14 games behind the Braves, and with a losing record.

This lead of nine games in the standings was the largest lead that the Braves had ever had since they moved to Atlanta for the 1966 season. The Braves' All-Star outfielder Dale Murphy had 11 hits in 16 at-bats in the sweep over the Padres, and for the season, he was batting .308 and leading the National League with 28 home runs and 74 runs batted in (RBI). Their other big bats were those of their third baseman Bob Horner, who was batting .289 with 20 home runs so far, and their first baseman Chris Chambliss, a .259 hitter thus far with 11 homers and 48 RBI. Their only reliable starting pitcher was Phil Niekro (10–3, 3.27 ERA), and their two big guns as relief pitchers were Steve Bedrosian with a 1.46 ERA, and Gene Garber with a 2.16 ERA and 19 saves already. The overall pitching staff had a 3.60 ERA, and the team batting average was .262. The Braves had scored 447 runs so far. Rick Camp, a part-time starter, was 8–4 with a 3.14 ERA

This big lead in the Western Division did not last for long. During that stretch of 21 games against just the Dodgers, the Giants, the Padres, and the Montreal Expos, the Braves seemed to be moving in slow motion both on the pitcher's mound and in the batting boxes as they slumped badly and lost 19 out of 21 games – including an 11-game losing steak and four-game losing streaks twice.

The Dodgers, under their long-time manager Tommy Lasorda, had turned both hot and lucky at the same time. Eight out of those 19 losses during this frantic nose-dive by the Braves were to the Dodgers, who swept the Braves 4–0 in two series against them in a 10-day period. The Braves' wins and losses during these 21 games were against the Dodgers (0–8), the Giants (1–5), the Padres (1–3), and the Expos (0–3).

On August 18, the Braves lost their third game in a row to the Expos, completing another four-game losing streak, and their won-loss record had fallen to 63–56. In so doing, they had fallen into second place in the Western Division, four games behind the Dodgers, who had moved into first place by winning 16 out of 20 games. The Braves seemed to be on track to lose the Western Division for the 13th year in a row, and miss the post-season once again. The Braves had not won a playoff series since they won the World Series in 1957, and they had played in few playoff games since then (seven vs. the New York Yankees in 1958, two vs. the Dodgers in 1959, and three vs. the New York Mets in 1969 – and losing nine of those games).

However, the Braves righted themselves as a team, and their clouds of bad luck seemed to part. Beginning on August 19 with a win over the Expos in the last game of the series with them, the Braves roared back into first place by winning 13 out of 15 games while the Dodgers played ordinary baseball.

On September 3, the Braves' won-loss record had improved to 76–58; they were ahead of the Dodgers by 2½ games. However, their travails were not over, as they once again lost four games in a row and fell back into second place behind the Dodgers. Now, it was time for head-to-head competition with the Dodgers again.  The Braves defeated the Dodgers in two consecutive games, on September 8 and 9, to once again move into first place (with a 78–62 record) by 1½ games over the Dodgers.

There was more hardship to come. The Braves lost eight out of 12 games, including six losses to a different nemesis this time, the Houston Astros. This dropped the Braves back into second place, a full three games behind the Dodgers on September 22.

However, the Braves won seven out of their next nine games, while the Dodgers played ordinary baseball, and the Braves moves into first place for good on September 28. However, there was a final day of severe tension on the last day of the season. Beginning that day, the Braves were one game ahead of the Dodgers, with the Braves holding an 89–72 record and the Dodgers holding an 88–73 record. The Braves had a game in the Eastern Time Zone earlier in the day, and the Dodgers had a game with the Giants in San Francisco later on in the day in the Pacific Time Zone.

The Braves could have clinched the division championship by winning, but they lost their last game vs. the Padres 5–1 to fall to an 89–73 record. Then, in the later game, the Dodgers could have tied for first place by defeating the Giants. If that had happened, it would have required a one-game playoff between the Dodgers and the Braves to determine the Division champion. However, late in that game in San Francisco, former Cincinnati Reds' second baseman Joe Morgan hit a home run against the Dodgers to knock them down to an 88–74 record, and out of the playoffs. Phil Niekro finished the season as the pitching star of the Braves with a 17–4 record, and Dale Murphy won the National League Most Valuable Player trophy by winning the league championship in home runs, tying for the championship in RBIs, and winning a Gold Glove in the outfield.

The Braves had won their second Western Division title, and they were bound for the National League Championship Series against the St. Louis Cardinals. The Braves had won the first-ever Western Division championship in 1969, the year in which the Eastern Division and the Western Division had been established. Then, the Braves had posted a 93–69 won-loss record by playing very strongly in second half of the season. For the Braves, Niekro himself had finished second for the Cy Young Award with 23 wins, and Hank Aaron had finished second in the league with 44 home runs. Thus, each of these teams had won the division by having one truly outstanding pitcher, and one truly outstanding batter.

Since the Braves had finished at 89–73, they had recorded a 76–73 record after beginning the season at 13–0. On the other hand, the Braves recorded a 26–17 record after August 18. 1982 was just the Braves' second season with a winning record since they recorded an 88–74 record in 1974 and finished in third place in the Western Division. The Braves' only other (barely) winning season during that period was in 1980, when they struggled to an 81–80 finish. (The Braves played an odd number of games in 1980 since they had a game rained out during the season, and since the 162nd game would have no effect whatsoever on the standings, no make-up game for that game was ever played. It had become a moot point by then.)

Stars 

Although it was their field manager Joe Torre who led the Braves back to the Western Division championship in 1982, there was a kernel of Braves' players who made the difference in this season. Two of these were Dale Murphy and Bob Horner, the latter of whom batted .261 with 32 home runs and 97 RBI – but missed most of August and September with a broken wrist that he suffered while diving for a batted ball while playing third base. Murphy, who usually batted ahead of Horner in the line-up, posted a healthier .281 batting average with 36 home runs, 109 RBI, and 23 stolen bases, and he also led the team in runs scored. As mentioned before, Murphy won the league MVP trophy.

The Braves' first baseman, Chris Chambliss, batted .270, with 20 home runs and 88 RBI.Outfielder Claudell Washington had one of his best seasons with the Braves in 1982. He batted .266 with 16 homers and 80 RBI. The twenty-four-year-old second base-shortstop duo of Glenn Hubbard and Rafael Ramírez proved to be stellar on defense, and steady on offense – often getting on base ahead of Murphy and Horner. They were adept at turning double plays around the second-base bag. Hubbard batted .248 with nine home runs and 59 RBI, while Ramírez batted higher with a .278 average, ten home runs, and 52 RBI.

Their utility infielder Jerry Royster batted rather well over the final two months of the season (with a .322 BBA) to finish the season with a .295 average in 261 at-bats. He had been batting just .180 on July 29. Royster's value was seen, and his high number of at bats accumulated, in that he filled in for either Hubbard or Ramirez when they needed a day off, and he also filled in at third base for many weeks while Horner was suffering from his broken wrist. If the need had arisen, Royster was also capable of playing at first base or in the outfield.

The part-time outfielder Rufino Linares batted .298 with two home runs and 17 RBI, but their opening-day starter in center field Brett Butler played well in the field, but he had an atrocious season at home plate where he batted just .217 and he hit just two doubles in 240 at bats (The slightly-built Butler never was a power hitter, and in 1982, he did not hit any homers.) The Braves's regular catcher Bruce Benedict batted .248 with just three home runs – one of them a grand slam that he hit of the great Dodger pitcher Fernando Valenzuela in a game during September. The Braves' backup catcher, Biff Pocoroba, finished with a .275 average in 120 at bats.

What the Braves lacked in their position players in 1982 were the following:
 A catcher who could either hit with  a lot of power or with a high batting average.
 An everyday left fielder who field well, and also bat extremely well, preferably with power.
 More depth both in the infield and the outfield, where often the Braves were quite thin, especially when they had players who suffered from serious problems, like Bob Horner and Brett Butler. This thinness on their squad also meant that they lacked much capability in pinch hitting.

Phil Niekro was the ace of Atlanta's pitching staff and led the team with a 17-4 win–loss record and a 3.61 ERA in 35 starts. Niekro also led the team with 144 strikeouts. Gene Garber led the team with 30 saves in 69 games, allowing just 4 home runs with a 2.34 ERA in 119.1 innings pitched. Steve Bedrosian was the best long-reliever posting an 8–6 record and a 2.42 ERA in 64 games. Despite having a 4.87 ERA in 27 games started, Bob Walk finished with an 11–9 win–loss record, tied for second on the team in pitching wins with Rick Camp who accumulated a record of 11–13, and a 3.85 ERA in 51 games, including starting 21 games. Rick Mahler rounded out the '82 Braves pitching staff with a 9–10 win–loss record and a 4.21 ERA in 33 starts over 205.1 innings pitched. Pascual Pérez, who was poised to breakout in the 1983 season, started just 11 games and made 5 relief appearances in the '82 season. He finished with a 4–4 record and a solid 3.06 ERA in 79.1 innings pitched.

Beyond Niekro, the Braves' starting pitching was extremely thin, and it caused a lot of problems. It was probably the work of a miracle worker that Joe Torre was able to get as much out of his starting pitchers as he did. Pascual Perez was also one year away from becoming a star pitcher for the Braves, which he did in 1983, along with a new rookie who came up in that same year. Bob Walk did not last very long for the Braves, and Rick Camp was destined to become a short-relief pitcher for the Braves in the future. Besides Niekro, the best thing that Torre had for his job of running a pitching staff made of bubble gum and bailing wire was his outstanding relief duo of Garber and Bedrosian. In Bedrosian, Torre had a future Cy Young Award Winner, but with the Philadelphia Phillies.

Season standings

Record vs. opponents

Opening Day starters 
 Rick Mahler
 Bruce Benedict
 Chris Chambliss
 Glenn Hubbard
 Rafael Ramírez
 Bob Horner
 Dale Murphy
 Brett Butler
 Claudell Washington

Notable transactions 
 April 23, 1982: Scott Patterson (minors) was traded by the Braves to the New York Yankees for Bob Watson.
 June 7, 1982: 1982 Major League Baseball draft
Duane Ward was drafted by the Braves in the 1st round (9th pick). Player signed June 18, 1982.
Zane Smith was drafted by the Braves in the 3rd round.
Randy Johnson was drafted by the Braves in the 4th round, but did not sign. (Note: This is not the same Randy Johnson who played for the Braves in 1982.)
 June 30, 1982: Larry McWilliams was traded by the Braves to the Pittsburgh Pirates for Pascual Pérez and a player to be named later. The Pirates finished the deal by sending Carlos Rios (minors) to the Braves on September 8.
 July 6, 1982: Preston Hanna was released by the Braves.

Roster

Game log 

|-
| 1||Tuesday,April 6||@ San Diego Padres||Jack Murphy Stadium||W, 1-0||R. Mahler (1-0)||Eichelberger (0-1)|| ||30,188||1-0
|-
| 2||Wednesday,April 7||@ San Diego Padres||Jack Murphy Stadium||W, 6-4||Walk (1-0)||Montefusco (0-1)||Garber (1)||16,684||2-0
|-
| 3||Friday,April 9||Houston Astros||Atlanta–Fulton County Stadium||W, 6-2||Boggs (1-0)||Sutton (0-1)||Hrabosky (1)||33,133||3-0
|-
| 4||Saturday,April 10||Houston Astros||Atlanta–Fulton County Stadium||W, 8-6||McWilliams (1-0)||Ruhle (0-1)||Camp (1)||10,885||4-0
|-
| 5||Sunday,April 11||Houston Astros||Atlanta–Fulton County Stadium||W, 5-0||R. Mahler (2-0)||Ryan (0-2)|| ||11,322||5-0
|-
| 6||Monday,April 12||@ Cincinnati Reds||Riverfront Stadium||W, 6-1||Walk (2-0)||Berenyi (1-1)|| ||11,451||6-0
|-
| 7||Tuesday,April 13||@ Cincinnati Reds||Riverfront Stadium||W, 8-5||Garber (1-0)||Kern (0-1)||||11,846||7-0
|-
| 8||Wednesday,April 14||@ Cincinnati Reds||Riverfront Stadium||W, 5-2(10 innings)||Camp (1-0)||Kern (0-2)||||14,217||8-0
|-
| 9||Friday,April 16||@ Houston Astros||Astrodome||W, 5-3||McWilliams (2-0)||Ryan (0-3)||Camp (2)||26,513||9-0
|-
| 10||Saturday,April 17||@ Houston Astros||Astrodome||W, 2-1||Hanna (1-0)||J. Niekro (1-1)||Garber (2)||33,688||10-0
|-
| 11||Sunday,April 18||@ Houston Astros||Astrodome||W, 6-5||Hrabosky (1-0)||D. Smith (0-1)||Camp (3)||29,166||11-0
|-
| 12||Tuesday,April 20||Cincinnati Reds||Atlanta–Fulton County Stadium||W, 4-2||Bedrosian (1-0)||Pastore (1-1)||Garber (3)||37,268||12-0
|-
| 13||Wednesday,April 21||Cincinnati Reds||Atlanta–Fulton County Stadium||W, 4-3||Camp (2-0)||Shirley (0-1)|| ||22,153||13-0
|-
| 14||Thursday,April 22||Cincinnati Reds||Atlanta–Fulton County Stadium||L, 1-2||Berenyi (3-1)||Walk (2-1)||Hume (3)||20,701||13-1
|-
| 15||Friday,April 23||San Diego Padres||Atlanta–Fulton County Stadium||L, 3-6(12 innings)||Chiffer (2-0)||Camp (2-1)|| ||37,105||13-2
|-
| 16||Saturday,April 24||@ San Diego Padres||Atlanta–Fulton County Stadium||L, 4-6||Show (2-0)||Garber (1-1)||DeLeon (1)||28,447||13-3
|-
| 17||Monday,April 26||Pittsburgh Pirates||Atlanta–Fulton County Stadium||L, 4-6||Tekulve (2-0)||McWilliams (2-1)|| ||9,557||13-4
|-
| 18||Tuesday,April 27||Pittsburgh Pirates||Atlanta–Fulton County Stadium||L, 4-10||Griffin (1-1)||Walk (2-2)|| ||6,763||13-5
|-
| 19||Wednesday,April 28||Pittsburgh Pirates||Atlanta–Fulton County Stadium||W, 7-6(10 innings)||Camp (3-1)||Scurry (1-1)|| ||6,318||14-5
|-
| 20||Thursday,April 29||Chicago Cubs||Atlanta–Fulton County Stadium||W, 3-0||Garber (2-1)||Jenkins (2-2)||Camp (4)||8,802||15-5
|-
| 21||Friday,April 30||Chicago Cubs||Atlanta–Fulton County Stadium||W, 1-0||Bedrosian (2-0)||Bird (1-4)||Garber (4)||19,757||16-5
|-

|-
| 22||Saturday,May 1||Chicago Cubs||Atlanta–Fulton County Stadium||L, 1-5||Martz (2-2)||R. Mahler (2-1)|| ||27,094||16-6
|-
| 23||Sunday,May 2||Chicago Cubs||Atlanta–Fulton County Stadium||W, 10-3||Walk (3-2)||Larson (0-3)||||19,494||17-6
|-
| 24||Monday,May 3||@ Pittsburgh Pirates||Three Rivers Stadium||W, 10-4||P. Niekro (1-0)||Solomon (1-3)||Garber (5)||4,636||18-6
|-
| 25||Tuesday,May 4||@ Pittsburgh Pirates||Three Rivers Stadium||L, 4-8||D. Robinson (2-0)||Cowley (0-1)|| ||4,836||18-7
|-
| 26||Wednesday,May 5||@ Pittsburgh Pirates||Three Rivers Stadium||L, 2-4||Rhoden (1-3)||R. Mahler (2-2)||Tekulve (2)||6,595||18-8
|-
| 27||Friday,May 7||@ St. Louis Cardinals||Busch Memorial Stadium||W, 6-3(10 innings)||Garber (3-1)||J. Martin (3-3)|| ||20,276||19-8
|-
| 28||Saturday,May 8||@ St. Louis Cardinals||Busch Memorial Stadium||L, 7-8||Sutter (1-0)||Camp (3-2)|| ||49,062||19-9
|-
| 29||Sunday,May 9||@ St. Louis Cardinals||Busch Memorial Stadium||W, 3-0||Hanna (2-0)||Andújar (3-3)||Garber (6)||25,115||20-9
|-
| 30||Tuesday,May 11||@ Chicago Cubs||Wrigley Field||L, 4-6||Bird (2-4)||R. Mahler (2-3)||Hernández (2)||11,876||20-10
|-
| 31||Wednesday,May 12||@ Chicago Cubs||Wrigley Field||W, 6-3||Walk (4-2)||Martz (3-3)||Garber (7)||11,392||21-10
|-
| 32||Thursday,May 13||St. Louis Cardinals||Atlanta–Fulton County Stadium||L, 9-10||Rincon (2-2)||Dayley (0-1)||Sutter (11)||16,244||21-11
|-
| 33||Friday,May 14||St. Louis Cardinals||Atlanta–Fulton County Stadium||W, 2-1||Garber (4-1)||Bair (3-1)|| ||28,396||22-11
|-
| 34||Saturday,May 15||St. Louis Cardinals||Atlanta–Fulton County Stadium||L, 6-7(10 innings)||Sutter (2-0)||Garber (4-2)||Forsch (1)||48,433||22-12
|-
| 35||Sunday,May 16||St. Louis Cardinals||Atlanta–Fulton County Stadium||W, 5-2||R. Mahler (3-3)||Mura (3-3)|| ||20,478||23-12
|-
| 36||Monday,May 17||@ Montreal Expos||Olympic Stadium||L, 0-4||Rogers (5-3)||Walk (4-3)|| ||20,107||23-13
|-
| 37||Tuesday,May 18||@ Montreal Expos||Olympic Stadium||W, 6-4||P. Niekro (2-0)||Gullickson (2-3)||Garber (8)||19,485||24-13
|-
| 38||Wednesday,May 19||@ Montreal Expos||Olympic Stadium||W, 9-1||Dayley (1-1)||Burris (0-7)|| ||11,634||25-13
|-
| 39||Friday,May 21||Philadelphia Phillies||Atlanta–Fulton County Stadium||W, 7-6||Bedrosian (3-0)||Lyle (1-1)|| ||28,050||26-13
|-
| 40||Saturday,May 22||Philadelphia Phillies||Atlanta–Fulton County Stadium||L, 2-5||Krukow (4-2)||McWilliams (2-2)||Farmer (4)||25,925||26-14
|-
| 41||Sunday,May 23||Philadelphia Phillies||Atlanta–Fulton County Stadium||L, 1-2||Ruthven (3-3)||P. Niekro (2-1)||Farmer (5)||27,965||26-15
|-
| 42||Monday,May 24||New York Mets||Atlanta–Fulton County Stadium||L, 3-5||Zachry (4-1)||Dayley (1-2)||Allen (11)||10,388||26-16
|-
| 43||Tuesday,May 25||New York Mets||Atlanta–Fulton County Stadium||W, 10-2||R. Mahler (4-3)||Scott (3-4)|| ||9,581||27-16
|-
| 44||Wednesday,May 26||New York Mets||Atlanta–Fulton County Stadium||L, 4-6||Swan (3-1)||Camp (3-3)||Allen (12)||12,460||27-17
|-
| 45||Saturday,May 29||@ Philadelphia Phillies||Veterans Stadium||L, 0-1||Ruthven (4-3)||P. Niekro (2-2)|| ||26,790||27-18
|-
| 46||Sunday,May 30||@ Philadelphia Phillies||Veterans Stadium||L, 2-6||Carlton (6-6)||R. Mahler (4-4)|| ||35,662||27-19
|-
| 47||Monday,May 31||@ New York Mets||Shea Stadium||L, 4-10||Puleo (5-2)||Walk (4-4)|| ||21,954||27-20
|-

|-
| 48||Tuesday,June 1||@ New York Mets||Shea Stadium||W, 7-3||Dayley (2-2)||Jones (6-4)|| ||9,367||28-20
|-
| 49||Wednesday,June 2||@ New York Mets||Shea Stadium||W, 3-1||P. Niekro (3-2)||Falcone (3-2)||Bedrosian (1)||18,652||29-20
|-
| 50||Saturday,June 5||Montreal Expos||Atlanta–Fulton County Stadium||W, 2-1||R. Mahler (5-4)||Gullickson (3-5)||Bedrosian (2)||29,391||30-20
|-
| 51||Sunday,June 6||Montreal Expos||Atlanta–Fulton County Stadium||L, 3-6||Reardon (3-0)||McWilliams (2-3)|| ||18,898||30-21
|-
| 52||Monday,June 7||@ Los Angeles Dodgers||Dodger Stadium||W, 4-3||P. Niekro (4-2)||Welch (5-4)||Bedrosian (3)||44,714||31-21
|-
| 53||Tuesday,June 8||@ Los Angeles Dodgers||Dodger Stadium||W, 4-3||Hanna (3-0)||Hooton (1-3)||Garber (9)||33,153||32-21
|-
| 54||Wednesday,June 9||@ Los Angeles Dodgers||Dodger Stadium||W, 11-5||R. Mahler (6-4)||Stewart (1-4)|| ||39,325||33-21
|-
| 55||Friday,June 11||@ San Francisco Giants||Candlestick Park||W, 5-3||Walk (5-4)||Chris (0-2)||Garber (10)||21,487||34-21
|-
| 56||Saturday,June 12||@ San Francisco Giants||Candlestick Park||W, 10-5||P. Niekro (5-2)||Gale (2-5)||Hrabosky (2)||10,569||35-21
|-
| 57||Sunday,June 13 (1)||@ San Francisco Giants||Candlestick Park||L, 1-2||R. Martin (2-3)||Dayley (2-3)||Minton (10)||27,521||35-22
|-
| 58||Sunday,June 13 (2)||||||W, 5-1||Camp (4-3)||Hammaker (3-4)||Garber (11)||||36-22
|-
| 59||Monday,June 14||@ Houston Astros||Astrodome||L, 0-9||J. Niekro (6-4)||R. Mahler (6-5)|| ||17,353||36-23
|-
| 60||Tuesday,June 15||@ Houston Astros||Astrodome||W, 7-0||Walk (6-4)||Knepper (2-8)|| ||17,837||37-23
|-
| 61||Wednesday,June 16||@ Houston Astros||Astrodome||W, 5-4(10 innings)||Garber (5-2)||Cappuzzello (0-1)|| ||18,673||38-23
|-
| 62||Friday,June 18||San Francisco Giants||Atlanta–Fulton County Stadium||W, 8-3||Dayley (3-3)||R. Martin (2-4)||Camp (5)||29,247||39-23
|-
| 63||Saturday,June 19||San Francisco Giants||Atlanta–Fulton County Stadium||L, 4-9||Lavelle (4-2)||Garber (5-3)|| ||30,497||39-24
|-
| 64||Sunday,June 20||San Francisco Giants||Atlanta–Fulton County Stadium||L, 3-5||Laskey (6-4)||Walk (6-5)||Minton (11)||18,556||39-25
|-
| 65||Monday,June 21||San Francisco Giants||Atlanta–Fulton County Stadium||W, 7-6||Camp (5-3)||Minton (3-4)|| ||10,485||40-25
|-
| 66||Tuesday,June 22||Los Angeles Dodgers||Atlanta–Fulton County Stadium||L, 1-4||Stewart (2-4)||Bedrosian (3-1)||S. Howe (4)||27,137||40-26
|-
| 67||Wednesday,June 23||Los Angeles Dodgers||Atlanta–Fulton County Stadium||W, 7-2||R. Mahler (7-5)||Valenzuela (9-6)|| ||33,212||41-26
|-
| 68||Thursday,June 24||Los Angeles Dodgers||Atlanta–Fulton County Stadium||L, 3-5||Reuss (9-5)||Walk (6-6)||S. Howe (5)||31,303||41-27
|-
| 69||Friday,June 25||@ Cincinnati Reds||Riverfront Stadium||W, 5-2||P. Niekro (6-2)||Berenyi (5-8)||Garber (12)||20,263||42-27
|-
| 70||Saturday,June 26||@ Cincinnati Reds||Riverfront Stadium||L, 1-2||Seaver (4-8)||Dayley (3-4)||Hume (16)||26,561||42-28
|-
| 71||Sunday,June 27||@ Cincinnati Reds||Riverfront Stadium||W, 2-0(14 innings)||Garber (6-3)||Hume (1-3)||Hrabosky (3)||31,000||43-28
|-
| 72||Monday,June 28||Houston Astros||Atlanta–Fulton County Stadium||L, 2-6||Ryan (7-8)||R. Mahler (7-6)|| ||12,837||43-29
|-
| 73||Tuesday,June 29||Houston Astros||Atlanta–Fulton County Stadium||W, 6-5(11 innings)||Bedrosian (4-1)||LaCoss (3-3)|| ||10,483||44-29
|-
| 74||Wednesday,June 30||Houston Astros||Atlanta–Fulton County Stadium||W, 5-4||C. Diaz (1-0)||Knepper (2-9)|| ||10,308||45-29
|-

|-
| 75||Friday,July 2||Cincinnati Reds||Atlanta–Fulton County Stadium||W, 6-4||Dayley (4-4)||Seaver (4-9)||Garber (13)||32,709||46-29
|-
| 76||Saturday,July 3||Cincinnati Reds||Atlanta–Fulton County Stadium||W, 4-2||R. Mahler (8-6)||Soto (7-5)||Garber (14)||38,103||47-29
|-
| 77||Sunday,July 4||Cincinnati Reds||Atlanta–Fulton County Stadium||W, 4-1||Walk (7-6)||Shirley (2-6)||Bedrosian (4)||48,905||48-29
|-
| 78||Monday,July 5||Chicago Cubs||Atlanta–Fulton County Stadium||W, 7-5||Hrabosky (2-0)||L. Smith (1-5)||Garber (15)||19,169||49-29
|-
| 79||Tuesday,July 6||Chicago Cubs||Atlanta–Fulton County Stadium||L, 2-7||Bird (5-8)||Dayley (4-5)||Hernández (7)||15,108||49-30
|-
| 80||Wednesday,July 7||St. Louis Cardinals||Atlanta–Fulton County Stadium||W, 3-2||Camp (6-3)||Andújar (7-7)||Garber (16)||20,054||50-30
|-
| 81||Thursday,July 8||St. Louis Cardinals||Atlanta–Fulton County Stadium||L, 2-5||Stuper (4-1)||R. Mahler (8-7)||Bair (4)||23,610||50-31
|-
| 82||Friday,July 9||Pittsburgh Pirates||Atlanta–Fulton County Stadium||W, 6-4||C. Diaz (2-0)||Rhoden (5-8)||Bedrosian (5)||28,601||51-31
|-
| 83||Saturday,July 10||Pittsburgh Pirates||Atlanta–Fulton County Stadium||L, 1-6||D. Robinson (10-3)||P. Niekro (6-3)|| ||39,444||51-32
|-
| 84||Sunday,July 11||Pittsburgh Pirates||Atlanta–Fulton County Stadium||L, 1-3||McWilliams (5-3)||Dayley (4-6)||Tekulve (12)||19,130||51-33
|-
| 85||Thursday,July 15||@ Chicago Cubs||Wrigley Field||W, 11-4||P. Niekro (7-3)||Jenkins (6-10)|| ||19,336||52-33
|-
| 86||Friday,July 16||@ Chicago Cubs||Wrigley Field||L, 3-4(10 innings)||Campbell (2-4)||Garber (6-4)|| ||15,624||52-34
|-
| 87||Saturday,July 17||@ Chicago Cubs||Wrigley Field||W, 9-4||Walk (8-6)||Noles (6-8)|| ||23,302||53-34
|-
| 88||Sunday,July 18||@ Chicago Cubs||Wrigley Field||W, 4-2||Camp (7-3)||Bird (6-9)|| ||15,816||54-34
|-
| 89||Monday,July 19||@ St. Louis Cardinals||Busch Memorial Stadium||W, 4-1||P. Niekro (8-3)||Andújar (7-9)||Garber (17)||23,000||55-34
|-
| 90||Tuesday,July 20||@ St. Louis Cardinals||Busch Memorial Stadium||W, 8-6||Cowley (1-1)||Lahti (1-1)||Bedrosian (6)||20,894||56-34
|-
| 91||Wednesday,July 21||@ St. Louis Cardinals||Busch Memorial Stadium||L, 0-8||Mura (7-7)||Walk (8-7)|| ||19,899||56-35
|-
| 92||Friday,July 23||@ Pittsburgh Pirates||Three Rivers Stadium||L, 0-6||Rhoden (6-8)||Camp (7-4)|| ||22,722||56-36
|-
| 93||Saturday,July 24||@ Pittsburgh Pirates||Three Rivers Stadium||W, 4-3||P. Niekro (9-3)||D. Robinson (10-5)||Garber (18)||26,790||57-36
|-
| 94||Sunday,July 25||@ Pittsburgh Pirates||Three Rivers Stadium||L, 0-8||Candelaria (7-4)||R. Mahler (8-8)|| ||22,565||57-37
|-
| 95||Tuesday,July 27 (1)||San Diego Padres||Atlanta–Fulton County Stadium||W, 9-2||Walk (9-7)||Lollar (10-5)||||32,151||5837
|-
| 96||Tuesday,July 27 (2)||||||W, 8-6(10 innings)||Bedrosian (5-1)||Lucas (0-7)|| || ||59-37
|-
| 97||Wednesday,July 28||San Diego Padres||Atlanta–Fulton County Stadium||W, 8-6||P. Niekro (10-3)||Hawkins (1-2)||Garber (19)||22,574||60-37
|-
| 98||Thursday,July 29||San Diego Padres||Atlanta–Fulton County Stadium||W, 6-2||Camp (8-4)||Welsh (5-5)||Diaz (1)||26,492||61-37
|-
| 99||Friday,July 30 (1)||Los Angeles Dodgers||Atlanta–Fulton County Stadium||L, 9-10||Forster (4-5)||Bedrosian (5-2)||Howe (11)||47,787||61-38
|-
| 100||Friday,July 30 (2)||||||L, 2-8||Welch (11-7)||Cowley (1-2)|| || ||61-39
|-
| 101||Saturday,July 31||Los Angeles Dodgers||Atlanta–Fulton County Stadium||L, 0-3||Valenzuela (14-8)||Pérez (0-1)|| ||46,694||61-40
|-

|-
| 102||Sunday,August 1||Los Angeles Dodgers||Atlanta–Fulton County Stadium||L, 4-9||Stewart (6-6)||Diaz (2-1)|| ||33,957||61-41
|-
| 103||Monday,August 2||San Francisco Giants||Atlanta–Fulton County Stadium||W, 7-3||Walk (10-7)||Breining (5-4)||Bedrosian (7)||15,018||62-41
|-
| 104||Tuesday,August 3||San Francisco Giants||Atlanta–Fulton County Stadium||L, 3-6||Minton (8-4)||Garber (6-5)|| ||13,607||62-42
|-
| 105||Wednesday,August 4||San Francisco Giants||Atlanta–Fulton County Stadium||L, 2-3||Lavelle (5-5)||Bedrosian (5-3)||Minton (18)||13,607||62-43
|-
| 106||Thursday,August 5||@ Los Angeles Dodgers||Dodger Stadium||L, 2-3(10 innings)||Forster (5-5)||Garber (6-6)|| ||49,607||62-44
|-
| 107||Friday,August 6||@ Los Angeles Dodgers||Dodger Stadium||L, 4-5(10 innings)||Howe (6-2)||Bedrosian (5-4)|| ||51,423||62-45
|-
| 108||Saturday,August 7||@ Los Angeles Dodgers||Dodger Stadium||L, 6-7(11 innings)||Beckwith (2-0)||Bedrosian (5-5)|| ||50,473||62-46
|-
| 109||Sunday,August 8||@ Los Angeles Dodgers||Dodger Stadium||L, 0-2||Welch (13-7)||Camp (8-5)||Niedenfuer (6)||51,494||62-47
|-
| 110||Monday,August 9||@ San Francisco Giants||Candlestick Park||L, 0-5||Barr (2-2)||Pérez (0-2)||||29,846||62-48
|-
| 111||Tuesday,August 10||@ San Francisco Giants||Candlestick Park||L, 2-3||Laskey (11-8)||Hrabosky (2-1)|| ||19,390||62-49
|-
| 112||Wednesday,August 11||@ San Francisco Giants||Candlestick Park||L, 6-8(12 innings)||Breining (7-4)||Diaz (2-2)|| ||22,940||62-50
|-
| 113||Thursday,August 12||@ San Diego Padres||Jack Murphy Stadium||L, 8-2||Welsh (6-5)||Walk (10-8)|| ||32,540||62-51
|-
| 114||Friday,August 13||@ San Diego Padres||Jack Murphy Stadium||L, 4-7||Dravecky (3-1)||Camp (8-6)|| ||33,968||62-52
|-
| 115||Saturday,August 14||@ San Diego Padres||Jack Murphy Stadium||W, 6-5||Moore (1-0)||Eichelberger (6-10)||Garber (20)||36,187||63-52
|-
| 116||Sunday,August 15||@ San Diego Padres||Jack Murphy Stadium||L, 5-6(10 innings)||L. DeLeon (5-4)||Bedrosian (5-6)|| ||21,740||63-53
|-
| 117||Tuesday,August 17 (1)||Montreal Expos||Atlanta–Fulton County Stadium||L, 7-13||Lea (10-6)||Walk (10-9)|| ||23,184||63-54
|-
| 118||Tuesday,August 17 (2)|| || ||L,2-3(10 innings)||Reardon (5-2)||R. Mahler (8-9)||Fryman (9)|| ||63-55
|-
| 119||Wednesday,August 18||Montreal Expos||Atlanta–Fulton County Stadium||L, 2-12||Gullickson (10-9)||Camp (8-7)|| ||12,627||63-56
|-
| 120||Thursday,August 19||Montreal Expos||Atlanta–Fulton County Stadium||W, 5-4||P. Niekro (11-3)||Fryman (7-3)||Garber (21)||12,205||64-56
|-
| 121||Friday,August 20||New York Mets||Atlanta–Fulton County Stadium||W, 2-1(10 innings)||Bedrosian (6-6)||Zachry (6-5)||||33,144||65-56
|-
| 122||Saturday,August 21||New York Mets||Atlanta–Fulton County Stadium||W, 6-5||Walk (11-9)||R. Jones (7-10)||Garber (22)||41,477||66-56
|-
| 123||Sunday,August 22||New York Mets||Atlanta–Fulton County Stadium||W, 10-9||C. Diaz (3-2)||Orosco (2-9)||Garber (23)||20,466||67-56
|-
| 124||Monday,August 23||Philadelphia Phillies||Atlanta–Fulton County Stadium||W, 4-3||Camp (9-7)||Ron Reed (3-4)|| ||16,224||68-56
|-
| 125||Tuesday,August 24||Philadelphia Phillies||Atlanta–Fulton County Stadium||W, 9-7||P. Niekro (12-3)||Carlton (16-9)||Garber (24)||22,709||69-56
|-
| 126||Wednesday,August 25||Philadelphia Phillies||Atlanta–Fulton County Stadium||L, 9-11(10 innings)||Ron Reed (4-4)||Garber (6-7)|| ||23,955||69-57
|-
| 127||Friday,August 27||@ New York Mets||Shea Stadium||W, 9-8||Moore (2-0)||Orosco (2-10)|| ||14,133||70-57
|-
| 128||Saturday,August 28||@ New York Mets||Shea Stadium||W, 4-3||Camp (10-7)||Scott (7-12)||Garber (25)||22,017||71-57
|-
| 129||Sunday,August 29||@ New York Mets||Shea Stadium||W, 9-4||P. Niekro (13-3)||Hausman (1-2)||Bedrosian (8)||34,471||72-57
|-
| 130||Monday,August 30 (1)||@ Philadelphia Phillies||Veterans Stadium||L, 1-6||Ruthven (10-10)||Pérez (0-3)|| ||43,854||72-58
|-
| 131||Monday,August 30 (2)||||||W, 11-9(12 innings)||Bedrosian (7-6)||McGraw (2-3)||Moore (1)|| ||73-58
|-
| 132||Tuesday,August 31||@ Philadelphia Phillies||Veterans Stadium||W, 3-0||T. Boggs (2-0)||Farmer (2-5)||Garber (26)||29,380||74-58
|-

|-
| 133||Wednesday,September 1||@ Philadelphia Phillies||Veterans Stadium||W, 4-0||Camp (11-7)||Krukow (12-8)||Garber (27)||24,788||75-58
|-
| 134||Friday,September 3||@ Montreal Expos||Olympic Stadium||W, 4-3||P. Niekro||Lea (11-8)||Bedrosian (9)||28,065||76-58
|-
| 135||Saturday,September 4||@ Montreal Expos||Olympic Stadium||L, 1-4||Sanderson (9-11)||Pérez (0-4)||Reardon (22)||32,526||76-59
|-
| 136||Sunday,September 5||@ Montreal Expos||Olympic Stadium||L, 1-2||S. Rogers||Garber (6-8)|| ||56,807||76-60
|-
| 137||Monday,September 6||San Francisco Giants||Atlanta–Fulton County Stadium||L, 2-8||Holland (5-3)||Moore (2-1)||Minton (25)||9,051||76-61
|-
| 138||Tuesday,September 7||San Francisco Giants||Atlanta–Fulton County Stadium||L, 2-3||Barr (4-3)||Camp (11-8)||Minton (26)||7,523||76-62
|-
| 139||Wednesday,September 8||Los Angeles Dodgers||Atlanta–Fulton County Stadium||W, 12-11(10 innings)||Garber (7-8)||S. Howe (6-4)|| ||24,853||77-62
|-
| 140||Thursday,September 9||Los Angeles Dodgers||Atlanta–Fulton County Stadium||W, 10-3||R. Mahler||Valenzuela (17-12)||Bedrosian||35,362||78-62
|-
| 141||Friday,September 10||Cincinnati Reds||Atlanta–Fulton County Stadium||W, 8-2||Pérez (1-4)||Shirley (6-12)|| ||17,407||79-62
|-
| 142||Saturday,September 11||Cincinnati Reds||Atlanta–Fulton County Stadium||L, 3-4||Soto (12-11)||T. Boggs (2-1)|| ||20,966||79-63
|-
| 143||Sunday,September 12||Cincinnati Reds||Atlanta–Fulton County Stadium||W, 4-3||Bedrosian (8-6)||Harris (2-6)|| ||16,442||80-63
|-
| 144||Monday,September 13||Houston Astros||Atlanta–Fulton County Stadium||L, 3-5||J. Niekro (15-10)||P. Niekro (14-4)|| ||7,556||80-64
|-
| 145||Tuesday,September 14||Houston Astros||Atlanta–Fulton County Stadium||L, 0-4||LaCoss (5-6)||R. Mahler (9-10)||LaCorte (5)||9,331||80-65
|-
| 146||Wednesday,September 15||Houston Astros||Atlanta–Fulton County Stadium||L, 4-5||Ryan (15-11)||T. Boggs (2-2)||D. Smith (11)||11,422||80-66
|-
| 147||Friday,September 17||@ Cincinnati Reds||Riverfront Stadium||L, 2-5||Soto (13-11)||Camp (11-9)|| ||11,630||80-67
|-
| 148||Saturday,September 18||@ Cincinnati Reds||Riverfront Stadium||W, 5-4||P. Niekro (15-4)||Pastore (8-11)||Garber (28)||14,121||81-67
|-
| 149||Sunday,September 19||@ Cincinnati Reds||Riverfront Stadium||W, 6-1||Pérez (2-4)||Berenyi (8-18)|| ||12,203||82-67
|-
| 150||Monday,September 20||@ Houston Astros||Astrodome||L, 3-4||D. Smith (4-4)||Garber (7-9)|| ||12,634||82-68
|-
| 151||Tuesday,September 21||@ Houston Astros||Astrodome||L, 3-5||Ruhle (8-13)||Camp (11-10)||Knepper (1)||15,374||82-69
|-
| 152||Wednesday,September 22||@ Houston Astros||Astrodome||L, 2-3||D. Smith (5-4)||Garber (7-10)||LaCorte (6)||16,821||82-70
|-
| 153||Friday,September 24||San Diego Padres||Atlanta–Fulton County Stadium||W, 11-6||Dayley (5-6)||M. Griffin (0-1)||Bedrosian (11)||25,819||83-70
|-
| 154||Saturday,September 25||San Diego Padres||Atlanta–Fulton County Stadium||W, 12-6||Moore (3-1)||Eichelberger (7-14)||Garber (29)||36,037||84-70
|-
| 155||Sunday,September 26||San Diego Padres||Atlanta–Fulton County Stadium||L, 2-3||Lucas (1-10)||Camp (11-11)|| ||38,941||84-71
|-
| 156||Monday,September 27||@ San Francisco Giants||Candlestick Park||W, 7-0||P. Niekro (16-4)||R. Martin (7-9)|| ||45,783||85-71
|-
| 157||Tuesday,September 28||@ San Francisco Giants||Candlestick Park||W, 8-3||Pérez (3-4)||Laskey (13-12)|| ||17,071||86-71
|-
| 158||Wednesday,September 29||@ Los Angeles Dodgers||Dodgers Stadium||W, 4-3(12 innings)||Garber (8-10)||Forster (5-6)|| ||45,757||87-71
|-
| 159||Thursday,September 30||@ Los Angeles Dodgers||Dodgers Stadium||L, 3-10||Hooton (4-7)||Camp (11-12)||Beckwith (1)||49,926||87-72
|-

|-
| 160||Friday,October 1||@ San Diego Padres||Jack Murphy Stadium||W, 4-0||P. Niekro (17-4)||Show (10-6)||||14,050||88-72
|-
| 161||Saturday,October 2||@ San Diego Padres||Jack Murphy Stadium||W, 4-2||Pérez (4-4)||Montefusco (10-11)||Garber (30)||43,077||89-72
|-
| 162||Sunday,October 3||@ San Diego Padres||Jack Murphy Stadium||L, 1-5||Lollar (16-9)||Camp (11-13)||Dravecky (2)||19,412||89-73
|-

Player stats

Batting

Starters by position 
Note: Pos = Position; G = Games played; AB = At bats; H = Hits; Avg. = Batting average; HR = Home runs; RBI = Runs batted in

Other batters 
Note: G = Games played; AB = At bats; H = Hits; Avg. = Batting average; HR = Home runs; RBI = Runs batted in

Pitching

Starting pitchers 
Note: G = Games pitched; IP = Innings pitched; W = Wins; L = Losses; ERA = Earned run average; SO = Strikeouts

Other pitchers 
Note: G = Games pitched; IP = Innings pitched; W = Wins; L = Losses; ERA = Earned run average; SO = Strikeouts

Relief pitchers 
Note: G = Games pitched; W = Wins; L = Losses; SV = Saves; ERA = Earned run average; SO = Strikeouts

National League Championship Series

Game 1: Take 1 
October 6, Busch Stadium

Game 1 was a wash – literally. The Braves led 1-0 behind Phil Niekro and were two outs from an official game when the umpire stopped it. When the rain did not subside, the game was canceled. Game 1 began from the start the following night in a match-up of the volatile Braves starter Pascual Pérez and longtime Cardinal starter Bob Forsch.

Game 1: Take 2 
October 7, Busch Stadium

Game 2 
October 9, Busch Stadium

Game 3 
October 10, Atlanta–Fulton County Stadium

Awards and honors 
 Dale Murphy, National League Most Valuable Player
 Dale Murphy, Gold Glove Award (NL OF), 1982
 Dale Murphy, Silver Slugger Award (NL OF): 1982
 Joe Torre, Associated Press NL Manager of the Year

1982 Major League Baseball All-Star Game
 Dale Murphy, outfield

Farm system

Notes

References 

 1982 Atlanta Braves team at Baseball-Reference
 1982 Atlanta Braves team page at baseball-almanac.com
 1982 Atlanta Braves Game Log at retrosheet.org

Atlanta Braves seasons
Atlanta Braves season
National League West champion seasons
Atlanta Braves